SM U-19 was a German Type U-19 U-boat built for the Imperial German Navy. Her construction was ordered on 25 November 1910, and her keel was laid down on 20 October 1911, at the Kaiserliche Werft Danzig. She was launched on 10 October 1912, and commissioned into the Imperial German Navy on 6 July 1913.

Service
From 1 August 1914, to 15 March 1916, U-19 was commanded by Constantin Kolbe. Her hull was badly damaged, but she survived and was repaired.

On 22 January 1915 the Durward was near the Maas lightship when they saw U-19 on the surface. They tried to escape, but as they could only manage 12 knots they were unable to do so. The mate of Durward, who was later interviewed by the Daily Mail special correspondent in Rotterdam  related how the second officer, who spoke excellent English, had ordered them to lower a boat and come to talk to them. The captain and crew were given ten minutes to leave the ship. The mate asked the second officer whether he could return to the ship to collect his clothes. He replied "Sorry, old man, it can't be done. I am in the mercantile marine myself, having been in the North German Lloyd service but now I am doing a bit for my country." The commander of the U-boat towed the lifeboat to within 100 yards of the Maas lightship, even stopping at one stage to repair the tow when it parted, after which the crew of Durward said goodbye to the submarine and rowed to the lightship.

During his brief command, Weisbach carried out an unusual mission: he delivered the revolutionary Roger Casement and two other agents to Banna Strand in Ireland in hopes that they would foment an uprising that would distract the United Kingdom of Great Britain and Ireland from World War I.

Weisbach was relieved on 11 August 1916, by Johannes Spiess, who was relieved in turn on 1 June 1917, by Heinrich Koch. Koch turned the boat over on 25 October 1917, to Hans Albrecht Liebeskind, who commanded for less than a month before being relieved on 17 November 1917, by Spiess again. On 1 June 1918, Liebeskind took over again and commanded U-19 until the end of the war.

Fate

On 11 November 1918, U-19 was surrendered to the British, and was broken up at Blyth sometime in 1919 or 1920.

The main gun of U19 was donated to the people of Bangor, Co. Down and today sits near the War Memorial in the town's Ward Park. It was donated by the Admiralty in recognition of the valorous conduct of Commander The Hon. Edward Bingham whilst on board  while fighting in the Battle of Jutland in July 1916, for which he received the Victoria Cross.

Summary of raiding history

References

Notes

Citations

Further reading
 - Total pages: 224

External links
Photos of cruises of German submarine U-54 in 1916-1918. Great photo quality, comments in German.
A 44 min. film from 1917 about a cruise of the German submarine U-35. A German propaganda film without dead or wounded; many details about submarine warfare in World War I.

Room 40:  original documents, photos and maps about World War I German submarine warfare and British Room 40 Intelligence from The National Archives, Kew, Richmond, UK.

Type U 19 submarines
U-boats commissioned in 1913
World War I submarines of Germany
1912 ships
Ships built in Danzig